Valentin Panteleimonovich Smirnov (b. 2 October 1937), is a Russian scientist, director of the Nuclear Fusion Institute at Kurchatov Institute, and academician (since 2003) of the Russian Academy of Sciences.

Graduation and awards 

 1961: Moscow Institute of Physics and Technology
 1981: Doctor degree phys.-math science
 1981: USSR State Prize
 1997: State Prize of the Russian Federation
 2002: Jesse W. Beams Research Award
 2005: Hannes Alfvén Prize of the European Physical Society, together with Malcolm Golby Haines and Thomas Sanford, "for their major contributions to the development of the multi-wire array in Z-pinch pulse-power physics".

References 

1937 births
Soviet physicists
20th-century Russian physicists
Moscow Institute of Physics and Technology alumni
Academic staff of the Moscow Institute of Physics and Technology
Full Members of the Russian Academy of Sciences
Recipients of the USSR State Prize
State Prize of the Russian Federation laureates
Soviet nuclear physicists
Russian nuclear physicists
Living people